Hockey at the 1964 Olympics may refer to:

Ice hockey at the 1964 Winter Olympics
Field hockey at the 1964 Summer Olympics